Respect is Earned (2007) was a professional wrestling pay-per-view (PPV) event promoted by Ring of Honor. It was the promotion's first PPV. It took place on May 12, 2007 from the Manhattan Center in New York, New York, and first aired on PPV on July 1.

Results

See also
2007 in professional wrestling
List of Ring of Honor pay-per-view events

References

External links
ROH's Official Results Page
Results at Prowrestlinghistory.com

Events in New York City
2007 in New York City
ROH Respect is Earned
Professional wrestling in New York City
May 2007 events in the United States
2007 Ring of Honor pay-per-view events